Pierre-Sébastien Laurentie (21 January 1793, in Houga, Gers, France – 9 February 1876) was a French writer and publicist, and a staunch anti-Gallican monarchist.

Life

He went to Paris in the early part of 1817, and on 17 June of the same year entered the famous pious and charitable association known as "La Congrégation". Through the patronage of the Royalist writer Joseph François Michaud, Laurentie became connected with the editorial staff of "La Quotidienne", in 1818; and in 1823 he was appointed Chief Inspector of Schools (inspecteur géréral des études), with the functions of which office he was able to combine his work as a publicist.

The complaint was made against his "Considérations sur les constitutions démocratiques" (1826) that it was aimed at the Villele Ministry, and censured its legislation in regard to the press. This charge, together with the attacks on the Ministry which appeared in "La Quotidienne" and the fact of Laurentie's friendly relations with Lamennais, led to Laurentie's dismissal from the office of Chief Inspector of Schools (5 November 1826).

"La Quotidienne" supported the Martignac Ministry until it issued the decrees of 16 June 1828, against the Jesuits, and the petits séminaires. Laurentie vigorously opposed these decrees. He purchased the old Benedictine college of Ponlevoy, which had existed for more than seven centuries and which, with the colleges of Juilly, Sorèze, and Vendôme, Napoleon had permitted to continue in existence side by side with the university. Laurentie's plan was to take advantage of this exceptional official authorization (which constituted a breach in the wall of the state university monopoly) to insure the prosperous existence of one independent educational institution.

As an octogenarian, Laurentie was the confidant of the Comte de Chambord, whose rights he daily championed in "L'Union".

Works

His earliest writings won for him a great reputation. They were: "De l'éloquence publique et de son influence" (1819); "Etudes littéraires et morales sur les historiens latins" (1822); "De la justice au XIXe siècle" (1822); "Introduction à la philosophie" (1826); "Considérations sur les constitutions démocratiques" (1826).

His work, "Sur l'étude et l'enseignement des lettres", published in 1828, was understood to embody the programme which he proposed to follow at Ponlevoy.

After 1830, Laurentie, defeated politically, devoted his efforts as a publicist to three great causes: (1) freedom of education; (2) Legitimism; (3) the defence of religion.

For the first of these, we may mention his "Lettres sur l'éducation" (1835–37), his "Lettres sur la liberté d'enseignement" (1844), and the part he played, in 1849 and 1850, in regard to the commission which prepared the Falloux Law; also his treatise, "L'Esprit chrétien dans les études" (1852), his book on "Les Crimes de l'éducation française" (1872), and his successful efforts for freedom of higher education (1875). 
In support of the second of these causes he wrote the pamphlet, "De la légitimité et de l'usurpation" (1830), the book "De la révolution en Europe" (1834), "De la démocratie et des périls de la société" (1849), "La Papauté" (1852), "Les Rois et le Pape" (1860), "Rome et le Pape" (1860), "Rome" (1861), "Le Pape et le Czar" (1862), "L'Athéisme social et l'Eglise, schisme du monde nouveau" (1869). Inspire d by the same cause, Laurentie also contributed, under the Monarchy of July, to "Le Rénovateur" and "La Quotidienne". Again, between 1848 and 1876, the battle for the principle of Legitimism went on day after day in the columns of the Royalist "L'Union", and in connection with this campaign Laurentie's "Histoire des ducs d'Orléans" was published in 1832, handling the Orleans family with great severity, and followed by the ten volumes of his "Histoire de France" (1841–55), a kind of historical illustration of his political doctrines.
As early as 1836 Laurentie conceived the idea, in defence of religion, of a Catholic encyclopedia which he prefaced with a Catholic theory of the sciences. In 1862 he published a pamphlet attacking scientific atheism. His "Histoire de l'Empire Romain" (1862) is an apology for infant Christianity, and his "Philosophie de la prière" (1864) contains the outpouring of a devout soul.

His "Souvenirs", left unfinished at his death, were published by his grandson in 1893.

References

Laurentie, Souvenirs inedits (Paris, 1893); 
Grandmaison, La Congregation, 1801-1830 (Paris, 1889), 209–74; 
Veuillot, Derniers melanges, III (Paris, 1909), 82,83

External links
Catholic Encyclopedia article

1793 births
1876 deaths
19th-century French historians
French male non-fiction writers